Postal codes in Bulgaria have four digits.

Postcode regions by province
Bulgarian postal codes have four digits. There are no separator characters. Below the first digit for each of the provinces of Bulgaria is shown.

 1xxx Sofia City (София-град)
 2xxx Sofia Province (Софийска област)
 3xxx Vratsa Province (Враца)
 4xxx Plovdiv Province (Пловдив)
 44xx Pazardzhik Province (Пазарджик)
 5xxx Veliko Tarnovo Province (Велико Търново)
 55xx Lovech Province (Ловеч)
 58xx Pleven Province (Плевен)
 6xxx Stara Zagora Province (Стара Загора)
 7xxx Rousse Province (Русе)
 8xxx Burgas Province (Бургас)
 9xxx Varna Province (Варна)

See also

Bulgaria